Pouteria grandiflora is a species of plant in the family Sapotaceae. It is endemic to Brazil.

References

Flora of Brazil
grandiflora
Near threatened plants
Taxonomy articles created by Polbot
Taxa named by Charles Baehni
Taxa named by Alphonse Pyramus de Candolle